Madecacesta gaudroni is a species of beetle in the family Buprestidae, the only species in the genus Madecacesta.

References

Monotypic Buprestidae genera